Alexander Ryrie (27 December 1827 – 29 May 1909) was an Australian politician, who was born in Sydney to Stewart Ryrie, a pastoralist and deputy commissary-general, and his second wife, Isabella Cassels. He farmed with his brothers in the Monaro district, notably near Bombala and Michelago. On 5 July 1860, he married Charlotte Faunce, with whom he had nine children, including Major General Sir Granville de Laune Ryrie and William M. Ryrie.

In 1880, he was elected to the New South Wales Legislative Assembly as the member for Braidwood, serving until his defeat in 1891. In 1892, he was appointed to the New South Wales Legislative Council, where he served until his death at Paddington on 29 May 1909.

See also 

 Stewart Ryrie, his father
 David Ryrie, his brother
 William Ryrie, his half brother
 Stewart Ryrie, Junior, his half brother
 Granville Ryrie, his son

References

 

1827 births
1909 deaths
Members of the New South Wales Legislative Assembly
Protectionist Party politicians
19th-century Australian politicians
Settlers of New South Wales